Tinagma klimeschi is a moth in the family Douglasiidae. It is found in Israel, Egypt and on Rhodes and Cyprus.

The wingspan is 7–9 mm. The forewings are white with grey scales.

The larvae feed on Echium diffusum. They mine the leaves of their host plant.

References

Moths described in 1991
Douglasiidae